The 2012–13 Dallas Mavericks season was the 33rd season of the franchise in the National Basketball Association (NBA). The Mavericks failed to qualify for the playoffs for the first time since 2000. This would also be the last time until 2017 that the Mavericks missed the playoffs.

Key dates
 June 28: The 2012 NBA draft took place at the Prudential Center in Newark, New Jersey.
 July 1: Free agency starts and players are allowed to sign contracts with new or their old teams.
 July 26: Schedule announced for new season.

Draft picks

On draft night, the Mavericks sent Tyler Zeller and Kelenna Azubuike to Cleveland for their 24th, 33rd and 34th picks, Jared Cunningham, Bernard James and Jae Crowder.
Darius Johnson-Odom was sent to Los Angeles for cash considerations.

Offseason
The Mavericks had several players coming into the free agency. Brandan Wright's option for another year was exercised on June 23. On July 1, 2012, the Mavs exercised the option on Vince Carter to sign him for the season.

Their main target was signing Deron Williams, who was under contract with Brooklyn until last year. They met with Williams on July 2, but he signed a five-year extension later with Brooklyn.

Jason Terry signed a three-year deal worth $15 million with Boston, while Jason Kidd agreed to a deal with the New York Knicks.

On July 11, Chris Kaman signed a one-year deal with the Mavs. It was also announced that they would amnesty Brendan Haywood.
Ian Mahinmi was sent to Indiana in a sign and trade for Darren Collison and Dahntay Jones.

The Mavericks won the bidding process for Elton Brand on July 13 with $2.1 million.

The Mavs signed O. J. Mayo on July 16.

The Mavs signed their draft picks Jae Crowder on July 20, and Jared Cunningham a day later.

On July 24, Delonte West agreed to re-sign with the Mavericks.

Bernard James, their third draft pick was signed to a contract on July 25.

Eddy Curry was claimed off waivers on October 25, 2012.

Season recap

Preseason
The Mavericks played in the 2012 NBA Europe Live Tour. On October 6 they faced German club Alba Berlin and three days later they played against FC Barcelona. They wrapped up the European tour with a record of 1–1. Against the Houston Rockets the Mavs won, thanks to a 20–0 run at the beginning of the third quarter, 123–104. They lost against the Phoenix Suns and the record fell to 2–2. The Mavs ended their preseason with a record of 4–4 after a win over the Charlotte Bobcats.

Regular season

The Mavs started their regular season at the Los Angeles Lakers and their new formed team. They took the lead in the second quarter and never looked back, at the end it was a 99–91 victory and the season started off the right foot. Despite leading by eight at the break, the Mavericks fell in their first back-to-back this season to the Jazz 94–113. In their home opener against the Charlotte Bobcats, the Mavericks blew them out by 27 with O. J. Mayo scoring 30 and the team going 16 of 25 from behind the arc. Mayo added another 30+ game and Darren Collison got his second straight double-double in a blowout win against Portland. Without Elton Brand, who was with his wife for the birth of his child, the Mavs won against the Toronto Raptors 109–104 with Chris Kaman starting for the first time and scoring 22, the same point amount that Mayo had. The Mavs fell, with Brand and Beaubois, to the New York Knicks who improved to a league-best 4–0 record. On the next night, the Mavs lost to Charlotte who defeated the Mavericks for the first time in 17 tries. The Mavs lost their first game at home and third straight game to the hands of the Minnesota Timberwolves. Against the winless Washington Wizards the Mavs took care of business and won by six, while putting up 40 points in the second quarter. Their next back-to-back started at the Indiana Pacers, who played without Danny Granger, but got the win in blowout fashion by 20. On the second night they took on the Cleveland Cavaliers and squeezed out a win by eight, 103–95. The Golden State Warriors came to town and defeated the Mavs after Overtime 105–101. Two days later, Jason Kidd and Tyson Chandler returned to Dallas with the New York Knicks. In a high scoring affair the Mavs closed it out and won by three, 114–111. The Lakers were next up to the Mavs on their home floor and got out there with a big win by 27. After a two-point loss against the Philadelphia 76ers the Mavs fell, for the first time this season, under .500. Without Collison the Mavericks failed on the second night of a back-to-back by losing to the Chicago Bulls. In the first game of Derek Fisher, which he started, the Mavs defeated the Detroit Pistons comfortably 92–77. When facing the Los Angeles Clippers, the Mavs got blown out by 22, the same number of turnovers they had for the game. On the next night, they won at the Phoenix Suns by three, after O. J. Mayo put them ahead late in the game. The Mavericks took on the Houston Rockets and it was a duel between James Harden and Mayo, who scored 39 and 40 points respectively. Mayo had the better on his side as the Mavs won by seven. Next up, the Mavs took care of the Sacramento Kings and blew them out 119–96. In the first game against ex-Maverick Jason Terry and his Boston Celtics the Mavs fell after double overtime. The Mavs moved to Canada to take on Toronto and got blown out badly. It also ended the streak of at least one three pointer in a game after 1,108 games, last time it happened was in 1999. On the next night they faced Minnesota and lost by eight after overtime, which moved their overtime record to 0–3. After being back on their home floor, the Mavs won against the 76ers, and split the season series against them. Without Fisher, Brand and Brandan Wright the Mavs lost by 15 to the Miami Heat. With Wright back, the Mavs fell to the Memphis Grizzlies by ten. Dirk Nowitzki returned against the San Antonio Spurs, but the Mavs still lost by 38. The game at the Oklahoma City Thunder went into overtime, and the Mavs again fell short, this time by six. In Nowitzki's home debut, the Mavericks lost to the Denver Nuggets by 21. In the last game in 2012, Vince Carter made his starting debut for the season, but could not prevent the Mavs from losing to the Spurs by 25. On New Year's Day the Mavs took on Washington and were able to win by nine, after being down by as much as 14 in the second quarter. In yet another overtime game, the Mavs fell to Miami by 10, which leads the Mavericks still winless in overtime games this season (0–6). Nowitzki made his first start in a game against the New Orleans Hornets, which marked the 15th different starting lineup this year for the Mavs. The Hornets meanwhile got out with a win in Overtime with Eric Gordon scoring eight points in the extra period, which marked the tenth consecutive loss for the Mavs in overtime. Back on the road, the Mavs lost to the Utah Jazz, which marked their 12th loss in the last 14 games. At LA, against the Clippers the Mavs failed to convert a 5-point lead going into the fourth quarter, to lose by six. Against the Kings, in the second night of a back-to-back, the Mavs won after overtime by five. The Mavs blew Memphis out back on their homecourt, by 21. Against Minnesota, who were without Kevin Love and coach Rick Adelman, the Mavs were able ton their third straight game, this time by 15. In another must-win game against Houston, the Mavs escaped with a five-point victory after being up by 11 in the fourth quarter. In yet another Overtime game against Oklahoma City, Kevin Durant scored 52 points (21 from the line) to help the Thunder win it. Mayo made a three to tie the game in regulation but Carter missed a chance to send it to double-overtime. At Orlando the Mavs had several double-digit leads before winning it by five in the end. Against the Sours, their third meeting, it looked like another 25+ loss, but the Mavs were able to cut it down late, to lose by six. Bernard James made his first career-start against Phoenix, with both Brand and Kaman coming off the bench. The Mavs were able to win comfortably by 15, in a game where Nowitzki moved past Allen Iverson in the all-time scoring list, now placed at 18th. In a rematch of Game 4 of the 2011 playoffs between Dallas and Portland, the Trail Blazers erased a 21-point deficit and won at the buzzer after a LaMarcus Aldridge shot. Without Nowitzki, against Golden State the Mavs lost another nailbiter, by three at the end. The Mavs were able to turn a fourth quarter in their favour and defeating the Suns for the third time this season. The Mavs lost their league-"best" ninth game by 20+ points against Oklahoma. Back home, the Mavs faced a must-win five-game homestand. They rallied back from 10+ points and won the game against Portland by 6 by just allowing 38 points in the second half after giving up 61 before the break. The Mavericks avoided being swept by Golden State in the season series by beating them by 25 points. Against the Atlanta Hawks the Mavs lost by four, which shrunk their playoff hopes to a minimum. The last game before the all-star break was successful against Sacramento. Carter scored 17 points in the third quarter, surpassing Larry Bird on the all-time scoring leader list and made his 1,600 three pointer of his career. The Mavs started the post all-star season with a win against Orlando. At New Orleans, the Mavericks needed two late threes by Mike James and Carter to escape with a four-point victory. On a marquee matchup with playoff intense, the Mavs lost to the LA Lakers by four. On a back-2-back, the Mavs lost at home to Milwaukee and at Memphis, shrinking their playoff hopes to a minimum. After three straight losses the Mavericks won at Brooklyn by 8, after being up by 20 in the fourth quarter. At Houston, the Mavericks got blown out badly, 103–136. Three days later, in the second straight game against Houston, this time at home, the Mavericks squeezed out a win. At Detroit, the Mavericks were able to win by three, after being up by 15 in the third quarter. Their third straight win came at Minnesota, where they won easily by 23. At Milwaukee, the Mavs were able to extend their winning streak to four. At San Antonio, the Mavericks had a chance to win the game but Carter missed a three at the buzzer. Back home and having eight of their next nine games at home, the Mavs defeated Cleveland by ten, after being down by double digits midway through the third quarter. In their last season matchup against OKC, the Mavs lost another nailbiter, by six at the end. This game marked the return of Brand into the starting lineup. At Atlanta, the Mavs wrapped up their last road game against an eastern conference team with a victory, 127–113. When Brooklyn came to town, the Mavs were unable to contain a ten-point lead from the first quarter. They lost eventually by 17 at the end. When Jason Terry returned to Dallas, he received a standing ovation by his first check-in into the game. However, the Mavs defeated Boston by ten. In another pivotal matchup, against Utah this time, the Mavs were able to win by five in the end, with the fourth quarter being safely in their hands. The Mavericks stretched their winning streak to three after an overtime victory over the Clippers. With a chance to get back to .500, the Mavs got blown out by Indiana. The Mavs ended their homestand with a hard-fought victory against the Bulls. They were down double-digits multiple times but Nowitzki managed to carry them when he hit the go-ahead three-pointer with 2.9 seconds to go. At the Lakers the Mavericks were not able to hang with them and lost by 20. At Denver, where the Nuggets held a 33–3 record, the Mavericks felt short by one when Andre Iguodala made a game winning layup with 2.8 seconds to go. At Sacramento, the Mavericks scored 41 points in the second quarter en route to a victory. At Portland, the Mavericks got a victory which put them one game under .500. After a home loss to Phoenix, the Mavericks were eliminated for the playoffs for the first time since 2000. The Mavs won an overtime game against Denver 108–105. After winning New Orleans, the Mavs reached the .500 mark for the first time since December 12 (121 days) and were able to shave their beards with Nowitzki scoring the 25,000th point during his career. Against Memphis, the Mavericks lost by six. Their last game of the season, against New Orleans, was won, so the Mavs ended the season at .500 (41–41).

Roster

Pre-season

|- bgcolor=ccffcc
| 1
| October 6
| @ Alba Berlin
| 
| three players (14)
| Shawn Marion (11)
| Darren Collison (9)
| O2 World14,504
| 1–0
|- bgcolor=ffcccc
| 2
| October 9
| @ FC Barcelona
| 
| Chris Kaman (15)
| Chris Kaman (10)
| Darren Collison (4)
| Palau Blaugrana16,236
| 1–1
|- bgcolor=ccffcc
| 3
| October 15
| Houston
| 
| O. J. MayoJae Crowder(20)
| Chris Kaman (11)
| Darren Collison (8)
| American Airlines Center17,245
| 2–1
|- bgcolor=ffcccc
| 4
| October 17
| Phoenix
| 
| Chris Kaman (16)
| Vince Carter (7)
| Darren Collison (6)
| American Airlines Center17,049
| 2–2
|- bgcolor=ffcccc
| 5
| October 20
| @ Atlanta
| 
| Jae Crowder (15)
| Elton Brand (10)
| Darren Collison (5)
| Philips Arena9,935
| 2–3
|- bgcolor=ccffcc
| 6
| October 22
| New Orleans
| 
| O. J. Mayo (13)
| Shawn Marion (12)
| Darren Collison (7)
| American Airlines Center16,982
| 3–3
|- bgcolor=ffcccc
| 7
| October 24
| Oklahoma City
| 
| Jae Crowder (21)
| Jae Crowder (9)
| Dominique Jones (4)
| Intrust Bank Arena15,004
| 3–4
|- bgcolor=ccffcc
| 8
| October 26
| Charlotte
| 
| Shawn Marion (24)
| Shawn Marion (12)
| O. J. Mayo (9)
| American Airlines Center19,239
| 4–4
|-

Regular season

Standings

Schedule

|- bgcolor=ccffcc
| 1
| October 30
| @ LA Lakers
| 
| Darren Collison (17)
| Elton Brand (11)
| Rodrigue Beaubois (5)
| Staples Center18,997
| 1–0
|- bgcolor=ffcccc
| 2
| October 31
| @ Utah
| 
| Darren Collison (17)
| Shawn Marion (11)
| Darren Collison (7)
| EnergySolutions Arena17,634
| 1–1

|- bgcolor=ccffcc
| 3
| November 3
| Charlotte
| 
| O. J. Mayo (30)
| Shawn Marion (9)
| Darren Collison (10)
| American Airlines Center19,490
| 2–1
|- bgcolor=ccffcc
| 4
| November 5
| Portland
| 
| O. J. Mayo (32)
| Shawn Marion (7)
| Darren Collison (13)
| American Airlines Center19,521
| 3–1
|- bgcolor=ccffcc
| 5
| November 7
| Toronto
| 
| Chris KamanO. J. Mayo (22)
| Bernard James (9)
| O. J. Mayo (6)
| American Airlines Center19,763
| 4–1
|- bgcolor=ffcccc
| 6
| November 9
| @ New York
| 
| O. J. Mayo (23)
| four players (7)
| Darren Collison (8)
| Madison Square Garden19,033
| 4–2
|- bgcolor=ffcccc
| 7
| November 10
| @ Charlotte
| 
| O. J. Mayo (22)
| Brandan Wright (8)
| Darren Collison (6)
| Time Warner Cable Arena15,763
| 4–3
|- bgcolor=ffcccc
| 8
| November 12
| Minnesota
| 
| Darren Collison (21)
| three players (5)
| Rodrigue Beaubois (7)
| American Airlines Center19,322
| 4–4
|- bgcolor=ccffcc
| 9
| November 14
| Washington
| 
| O. J. Mayo (25)
| Elton Brand (12)
| Darren Collison (5)
| American Airlines Center19,560
| 5–4
|- bgcolor=ffcccc
| 10
| November 16
| @ Indiana
| 
| O. J. Mayo (19)
| Chris Kaman (12)
| Darren Collison (4)
| Bankers Life Fieldhouse15,110
| 5–5
|- bgcolor=ccffcc
| 11
| November 17
| @ Cleveland
| 
| O. J. Mayo (19)
| Shawn Marion (10)
| Darren Collison (8)
| Quicken Loans Arena18,633
| 6–5
|- bgcolor=ffcccc
| 12
| November 19
| Golden State
| 
| O. J. Mayo (27)
| Chris Kaman (17)
| Vince CarterDarren Collison (5)
| American Airlines Center20,034
| 6–6
|- bgcolor=ccffcc
| 13
| November 21
| New York
| 
| O. J. Mayo (27)
| Elton Brand (8)
| Darren Collison (7) 
| American Airlines Center20,157
| 7–6
|- bgcolor=ffcccc
| 14
| November 24
| LA Lakers
| 
| Vince Carter (16)
| Shawn Marion (8)
| Rodrigue Beaubois (6)
| American Airlines Center20,423
| 7–7
|- bgcolor=ffcccc
| 15
| November 27
| @ Philadelphia
| 
| Chris Kaman (20)
| Elton BrandShawn Marion (8)
| O. J. Mayo (7)
| Wells Fargo Center15,107
| 7–8
|- bgcolor=ffcccc
| 16
| November 28
| @ Chicago
| 
| Shawn Marion (18)
| Elton Brand (6)
| Dominique Jones (5)
| United Center21,575
| 7–9

|- bgcolor=ccffcc
| 17
| December 1
| Detroit
| 
| O. J. Mayo (27)
| Elton Brand (12)
| Darren Collison (8)
| American Airlines Center20,285
| 8–9
|- bgcolor=ffcccc
| 18
| December 5
| @ LA Clippers
| 
| Vince Carter (16)
| Elton Brand (9)
| O. J. Mayo (7)
| Staples Center19,060
| 8–10
|- bgcolor=ccffcc
| 19
| December 6
| @ Phoenix
| 
| O. J. Mayo (23)
| Elton BrandChris Kaman (7)
| O. J. Mayo (5)
| US Airways Center17,517
| 9–10
|- bgcolor=ccffcc
| 20
| December 8
| @ Houston
| 
| O. J. Mayo (40)
| O. J. Mayo (8)
| Darren CollisonDerek Fisher (5)
| Toyota Center15,726
| 10–10
|- bgcolor=ccffcc
| 21
| December 10
| Sacramento
| 
| O. J. Mayo (19)
| O. J. Mayo (7)
| Derek Fisher (6)
| American Airlines Center19,737
| 11–10
|- bgcolor=ffcccc
| 22
| December 12
| @ Boston
|  
| O. J. Mayo (24)
| Shawn Marion (11)
| Shawn Marion (7)
| TD Garden18,624
| 11–11 
|- bgcolor=ffcccc
| 23
| December 14
| @ Toronto
|  
| Chris Kaman (15)
| Shawn Marion (13)
| Derek Fisher (5)
| Air Canada Centre18,624
| 11–12
|- bgcolor=ffcccc
| 24
| December 15
| @ Minnesota
| 
| Derek FisherO. J. Mayo (20)
| Shawn Marion (10)
| O. J. Mayo (6)
| Target Center18,173
| 11–13
|- bgcolor=ccffcc
| 25
| December 18
| Philadelphia
| 
| O. J. Mayo (26)
| Shawn Marion (9)
| O. J. Mayo (8)
| American Airlines Center20,162
| 12–13
|- bgcolor=ffcccc
| 26
| December 20
| Miami
| 
| Jae Crowder (15)
| Bernard JamesShawn Marion (9)
| Dominique Jones (7)
| American Airlines Center20,160
| 12–14
|- bgcolor=ffcccc
| 27
| December 21
| @ Memphis
| 
| Vince CarterShawn Marion (14)
| Shawn Marion (11)
| Dominique Jones (7)
| FedExForum17,677
| 12–15
|- bgcolor=ffcccc
| 28
| December 23
| @ San Antonio
| 
| Darren Collison (15)
| Dirk Nowitzki (6)
| O. J. Mayo (6)
| AT&T Center18,581
| 12–16
|- bgcolor=ffcccc
| 29
| December 27
| @ Oklahoma City
| 
| Darren Collison (32)
| Shawn Marion (9)
| Shawn Marion (7)
| Chesapeake Energy Arena18,203
| 12–17
|- bgcolor=ffcccc
| 30
| December 28
| Denver
|  
| O. J. Mayo (15)
| Chris Kaman (8)
| Darren Collison (4)
| American Airlines Center20,439
| 12–18
|- bgcolor=ffcccc
| 31
| December 30
| San Antonio
|  
| Darren Collison (18)
| Elton Brand (10)
| Darren Collison (8)
| American Airlines Center19,928
| 12–19

|- bgcolor=ccffcc
| 32
| January 1
| @ Washington
|  
| Vince Carter (23)
| Shawn Marion (14)
| Darren Collison (8)
| Verizon Center14,456
| 13–19
|- bgcolor=ffcccc
| 33
| January 2
| @ Miami
|  
| O. J. Mayo (30)
| Chris Kaman (10)
| O. J. Mayo (6)
| American Airlines Arena20,102
| 13–20
|- bgcolor=ffcccc
| 34
| January 5
| New Orleans
|  
| Dirk Nowitzki (20)
| Shawn Marion (9)
| Dirk NowitzkiO. J. Mayo (5)
| American Airlines Center18,600
| 13–21
|- bgcolor=ffcccc
| 35
| January 7
| @ Utah
|  
| Dirk Nowitzki (20)
| three players (9)
| Darren Collison (5)
| EnergySolutions Arena20,338
| 13–22
|- bgcolor=ffcccc
| 36
| January 9
| @ LA Clippers
|  
| Darren Collison (22)
| Shawn Marion (7)
| Darren Collison (6)
| Staples Center19,362
| 13–23
|- bgcolor=ccffcc
| 37
| January 10
| @ Sacramento
| 
| O. J. Mayo (24)
| Shawn MarionO. J. Mayo (10)
| Jae CrowderO. J. Mayo (5)
| New Sacramento arena14,011
| 14–23
|- bgcolor=ccffcc
| 38
| January 12
| Memphis
|  
| Shawn Marion (20)
| Elton Brand (9)
| Darren Collison (6)
| American Airlines Center19,984
| 15–23
|- bgcolor=ccffcc
| 39
| January 14
| Minnesota
|  
| Darren Collison (23)
| Shawn Marion (8)
| Darren CollisonO. J. Mayo (9)
| American Airlines Center19,486
| 16–23
|- bgcolor=ccffcc
| 40
| January 16
| Houston
|  
| Dirk Nowitzki (19)
| Elton Brand (10)
| O. J. Mayo (8)
| American Airlines Center20,147
| 17–23
|- bgcolor=ffcccc
| 41
| January 18
| Oklahoma City
|  
| Vince Carter (29)
| Elton Brand (13)
| O. J. Mayo (7)
| American Airlines Center20,434
| 17–24
|- bgcolor=ccffcc
| 42
| January 20
| @ Orlando
|  
| Shawn Marion (20)
| Shawn Marion (10)
| Darren Collison (9)
| Amway Center18,192
| 18–24
|- bgcolor=ffcccc
| 43
| January 25
| San Antonio
|  
| Rodrigue Beaubois (19)
| Elton Brand (13)
| O. J. Mayo (7)
| American Airlines Center19,884
| 18–25
|- bgcolor=ccffcc
| 44
| January 27
| Phoenix
|  
| Shawn MarionDirk Nowitzki (18)
| Shawn Marion (9)
| O. J. Mayo (6)
| American Airlines Center20,305
| 19–25
|- bgcolor=ffcccc
| 45
| January 29
| @ Portland
| 
| Dirk Nowitzki (26)
| Shawn Marion (9)
| Darren CollisonO. J. Mayo (9)
| Rose Garden18,888
| 19–26
|- bgcolor=ffcccc
| 46
| January 31
| @ Golden State
|   
| O. J. Mayo (25)
| Shawn Marion (17)
| Darren Collison (7)
| Oracle Arena19,596
| 19–27

|- bgcolor=ccffcc
| 47
| February 1
| @ Phoenix
|   
| O. J. Mayo (20)
| Shawn Marion (11)
| Darren Collison (6)
| US Airways Center16,304
| 20–27
|- bgcolor=ffcccc
| 48
| February 4
| @ Oklahoma City
|  
| Shawn Marion (23)
| Elton BrandBrandan Wright (7)
| O. J. Mayo (6)
| Chesapeake Energy Arena18,203
| 20–28
|- bgcolor=ccffcc
| 49
| February 6
| Portland
|  
| O. J. Mayo (28)
| Elton BrandShawn Marion (10)
| Darren Collison (7)
| American Airlines Center19,746
| 21–28
|- bgcolor=ccffcc
| 50
| February 9
| Golden State
| 
| Shawn Marion (26)
| Elton BrandShawn Marion (11)
| O. J. Mayo (9)
| American Airlines Center20,355
| 22–28
|- bgcolor=ffcccc
| 51
| February 11
| Atlanta
| 
| Dirk Nowitzki (24)
| Dirk Nowitzki (7)
| Darren Collison (10)
| American Airlines Center19,654
| 22–29
|- bgcolor=ccffcc
| 52
| February 13
| Sacramento
| 
| Vince Carter (26)
| Shawn Marion (9)
| Darren Collison (9)
| American Airlines Center19,892
| 23–29
|- align="center"
|colspan="9" bgcolor="#bbcaff"|All-Star Break
|- bgcolor=ccffcc
| 53
| February 20
| Orlando
| 
| Elton BrandShawn Marion (17)
| Dirk Nowitzki (9)
| Darren Collison (9)
| American Airlines Center19,965
| 24–29
|- bgcolor=ccffcc
| 54
| February 22
| @ New Orleans
| 
| Dirk Nowitzki (25)
| Vince Carter (9)
| O. J. Mayo (9)
| New Orleans Arena16,538
| 25–29
|- bgcolor=ffcccc
| 55
| February 24
| LA Lakers
| 
| Dirk Nowitzki (30)
| Dirk Nowitzki (13)
| Darren CollisonMike James (4)
| American Airlines Center20,440
| 25–30
|- bgcolor=ffcccc
| 56
| February 26
| Milwaukee
| 
| Dirk Nowitzki (21)
| Dirk Nowitzki (20)
| Darren Collison (8)
| American Airlines Center19,870
| 25–31
|- bgcolor=ffcccc
| 57
| February 27
| @ Memphis
| 
| Shawn Marion (16)
| Shawn Marion (8)
| Darren Collison (6)
| FedExForum16,017
| 25–32

|- bgcolor=ccffcc
| 58
| March 1
| @ Brooklyn
| 
| Vince CarterDirk Nowitzki (20)
| Dirk Nowitzki (8)
| three players (3)
| Barclays Center17,732
| 26–32
|- bgcolor=ffcccc
| 59
| March 3
| @ Houston
| 
| O. J. Mayo (18)
| Shawn Marion (8)
| O. J. MayoDirk Nowitzki (4)
| Toyota Center18,123
| 26–33
|- bgcolor=ccffcc
| 60
| March 6
| Houston
| 
| Shawn MarionDirk Nowitzki (22)
| Vince Carter (7)
| O. J. Mayo (12)
| American Airlines Center20,344
| 27–33
|- bgcolor=ccffcc
| 61
| March 8
| @ Detroit
| 
| O. J. Mayo (22)
| Dirk NowitzkiVince Carter (7)
| Darren Collison (8)
| The Palace of Auburn Hills19,504
| 28–33
|- bgcolor=ccffcc
| 62
| March 10
| @ Minnesota
| 
| Vince Carter (22)
| Elton Brand (12)
| Darren Collison (8)
| Target Center15,209
| 29–33
|- bgcolor=ccffcc
| 63
| March 12
| @ Milwaukee
| 
| Vince Carter (23)
| Dirk Nowitzki (11)
| Mike James (7)
| BMO Harris Bradley Center14,154
| 30–33
|- bgcolor=ffcccc
| 64
| March 14
| @ San Antonio
| 
| Dirk Nowitzki (21)
| Dirk Nowitzki (11)
| Mike James (5)
| AT&T Center18,581
| 30–34
|- bgcolor=ccffcc
| 65
| March 15
| Cleveland
| 
| Rodrigue Beaubois (18)
| Jae Crowder (14)
| Rodrigue BeauboisDarren Collison (5)
| American Airlines Center20,482
| 31–34
|- bgcolor=ffcccc
| 66
| March 17
| Oklahoma City
| 
| Dirk Nowitzki (23)
| Jae CrowderBrandan Wright (7)
| Mike James (4)
| American Airlines Center20,284
| 31–35
|- bgcolor=ccffcc
| 67
| March 18
| @ Atlanta
| 
| Darren Collison (24)
| Brandan Wright (8)
| Darren CollisonDirk Nowitzki (5)
| Philips Arena14,505
| 32–35
|- bgcolor=ffcccc
| 68
| March 20
| Brooklyn
| 
| Dirk Nowitzki (16)
| Dirk Nowitzki (6)
| Mike James (7)
| American Airlines Center19,962
| 32–36
|- bgcolor=ccffcc
| 69
| March 22
| Boston
| 
| Brandan Wright (23)
| Shawn Marion (13)
| O. J. Mayo (9)
| American Airlines Center20,387
| 33–36
|- bgcolor=ccffcc
| 70
| March 24
| Utah
| 
| Mike James (19)
| Dirk NowitzkiShawn Marion (6)
| Darren CollisonMike James (9)
| American Airlines Center19,821
| 34–36
|- bgcolor=ccffcc
| 71
| March 26
| LA Clippers
| 
| Dirk Nowitzki (33)
| Dirk Nowitzki (9)
| Mike James (6)
| American Airlines Center20,291
| 35–36
|- bgcolor=ffcccc
| 72
| March 28
| Indiana
| 
| Dirk Nowitzki (21)
| Elton Brand (8)
| Darren Collison (8)
| American Airlines Center20,037
| 35–37
|- bgcolor=ccffcc
| 73
| March 30
| Chicago
| 
| Dirk Nowitzki (35)
| Brandan Wright (13)
| Mike James (7)
| American Airlines Center20,502
| 36–37

|- bgcolor=ffcccc
| 74
| April 2
| @ LA Lakers
| 
| Chris Kaman (14)
| Shawn Marion (7)
| Darren CollisonDirk Nowitzki (6)
| Staples Center18,997
| 36–38
|- bgcolor=ffcccc
| 75
| April 4
| @ Denver
| 
| Brandan Wright (16)
| Chris Kaman (9)
| Vince CarterO. J. Mayo (6)
| Pepsi Center19,155
| 36–39
|- bgcolor=ccffcc
| 76
| April 5
| @ Sacramento
| 
| Shawn Marion (25)
| Shawn Marion (12)
| Vince CarterDarren Collison (8)
| New Sacramento arena13,903
| 37–39
|- bgcolor=ccffcc
| 77
| April 7
| @ Portland
| 
| Chris Kaman (26)
| Chris Kaman (11)
| Darren Collison (8)
| Rose Garden20,228
| 38–39
|- bgcolor=ffcccc
| 78
| April 10
| Phoenix
| 
| Shawn Marion (22)
| Shawn Marion (9)
| O. J. Mayo (6)
| American Airlines Center19,725
| 38–40
|- bgcolor=ccffcc
| 79
| April 12
| Denver
| 
| Vince CarterDirk Nowitzki (22)
| Vince Carter (12)
| Vince Carter (7)
| American Airlines Center20,368
| 39–40
|- bgcolor=ccffcc
| 80
| April 14
| @ New Orleans
| 
| Shawn Marion (21)
| three players (7)
| Shawn Marion (6)
| New Orleans Arena17,246
| 40–40
|- bgcolor=ffcccc
| 81
| April 15
| Memphis
| 
| Dirk Nowitzki (26)
| Shawn Marion (8)
| Vince CarterDarren Collison (4)
| American Airlines Center19,833
| 40–41
|- bgcolor=ccffcc
| 82
| April 17
| New Orleans
| 
| Darren Collison (25)
| Dirk Nowitzki (9)
| three players (4)
| American Airlines Center19,833
| 41–41

Player statistics

|-
| 
|| 3 || 0 || 3.0 || .500 || .500 || .000 || .30 || .3 || .00 || .00 || 1.7
|-
| 
|| 45 || 0 || 12.2 || .369 || .292 || .789 || 1.30 || 1.9 || .42 || .09 || 4.0
|-
| 
|| 72 || 18 || 21.2 || .473 || .000 || .710 || 6.00 || 1.0 || .69 || style="background:#0B60AD;color:white;" |1.25 || 7.2
|-
| 
|| 81 || 3 || 25.8 || .435 || .406 || .816 || 4.10 || 2.4 || .93 || .54 || 13.4
|-
| 
|| 81 || 47 || 29.3 || .471 || .353 || .880 || 2.70 || style="background:#0B60AD;color:white;" |5.1 || style="background:#0B60AD;color:white;" |1.23 || .10 || 12.0
|-
| 
|| 78 || 16 || 17.3 || .384 || .328 || .644 || 2.40 || 1.2 || .81 || .22 || 5.0
|-
| 
|| 8 || 0 || 3.3 || .429 || style="background:#0B60AD;color:white;" |.667 || 1.000 || .40 || .1 || .13 || .00 || 2.0
|-
| 
|| 2 || 0 || 12.5 || .500 || .000 || .250 || 2.00 || .0 || .00 || .00 || 4.5
|-
| 
|| 2 || 0 || 2.0 || .000 || .000 || .000 || .00 || .0 || .00 || .00 || 0.0
|-
| 
|| 6 || 0 || 10.5 || .357 || .000 || .700 || .80 || .7 || .30 || .00 || 2.8
|-
| 
|| 9 || 9 || 25.4 || .354 || .435 || .913 || 1.70 || 3.6 || .60 || .20 || 8.6
|-
| 
|| 46 || 11 || 9.9 || .515 || .000 || .610 || 2.80 || .1 || .26 || .83 || 2.8
|-
| 
|| 45 || 23 || 19.2 || .373 || .384 || .793 || 1.60 || 3.1 || .58 || .07 || 6.1
|-
| 
|| 50 || 15 || 12.7 || .357 || .216 || .805 || 1.40 || .6 || .20 || .10 || 3.5
|-
| 
|| 29 || 3 || 11.7 || .367 || .111 || .660 || 1.60 || 2.9 || .50 || .10 || 4.0
|-
| 
|| 66 || 52 || 20.7 || .507 || .000 || .788 || 5.60 || .8 || .45 || .77 || 10.5
|-
| 
|| 67 || 67 || 30.0 || .514 || .315 || .782 || style="background:#0B60AD;color:white;" |7.80 || 2.4 || 1.10 || .70 || 12.0
|-
| 
| style="background:#0B60AD;color:white;" |82 || style="background:#0B60AD;color:white;" |82 || style="background:#0B60AD;color:white;" |35.5 || .449 || .407 || .820 || 3.50 || 4.4 || 1.13 || .28 || 15.3
|-
| 
|| 17 || 0 || 4.8 || .500 || .200 || 1.000 || .20 || .2 || .06 || .00 || 2.3
|-
| 
|| 14 || 1 || 18.3 || .361 || .314 || .909 || 3.50 || .50 || .70 || .40 || 4.6
|-
| 
|| 53 || 47 || 31.3 || .471 || .414 || .860 || 6.80 || 2.5 || .72 || .70 || style="background:#0B60AD;color:white;" |17.3
|-
| 
|| 64 || 16 || 18.0 || style="background:#0B60AD;color:white;" |.597 || .000 || .615 || 4.10 || .6 || .41 || 1.19 || 8.5
|-
| 
|| 3 || 0 || 1.3 || .500 || .000 || .000 || .00 || .0 || .00 || .00 || .7
|-

Injuries
During the first preseason game at Berlin, Rodrigue Beaubois injured his left foot.
Dirk Nowitzki sat out the second game of the preseason because of a right knee effusion. Both missed the next two preseason games against Houston and Phoenix.

On October 19, 2012 it was announced that Nowitzki underwent arthroscopic surgery on his right knee and missed games until late December.

Chris Kaman had a strained calf and missed the preseason games against Atlanta, the New Orleans and the rest of preseason action. He was also out the first two games of the regular season.

Brandan Wright was out against Charlotte due to a twisted ankle.

Beaubois missed the games against Charlotte, Portland and Toronto because he twisted his left ankle during practice.

Shawn Marion suffered a sprained MCL in the game against Portland in his left knee and missed the next three games.

Troy Murphy started the game against New York but was unable to play in the second half due to an illness.

Darren Collison had a sprained right middle finger and missed the game against Chicago.

Marion missed the game at Houston due to a strained groin and Sacramento.

Dominique Jones was ill and was not able to play against Sacramento.

Elton Brand was out against Philadelphia due to a sore groin.

Derek Fisher left the game against Philadelphia after five minutes with a right patellar tendon strain and missed the games against Miami, Memphis and San Antonio.

Brand (groin) and Wright (ankle) missed the game against Miami. Brand also missed the game against Memphis, while Wright was back.

Kaman missed the games against Portland, Golden State and Phoenix.

Nowitzki was out against Golden State and Phoenix.

Marion was out late in the year and missed some games due to a calf injury.

Beaubois fractured the second metacarpal in his left hand during a game against Oklahoma. He successfully underwent surgery on 20 March and will miss the remainder of the season.

Brand missed three games late in the season and Nowitzki sat out the fourth quarter at Portland.

Transactions

Trades

Free agents

Additions

Subtractions

Milestones
 On December 27, Shawn Marion appeared in his 1,000th career regular-season game against the Phoenix Suns.
 On February 13, Vince Carter recorded his 1,600th made three-pointer during a game against the Sacramento Kings.
 On March 6, Shawn Marion moved to 25th place on the NBA's all-time steals list during a game against the Houston Rockets.
 On March 18, Vince Carter recorded his 22,000th point during a game against the Atlanta Hawks.
 On March 20, Dirk Nowitzki recorded his 9,000th rebound during a game against the Brooklyn Nets.
 On April 14, Dirk Nowitzki recorded his 25,000th point during a game against the New Orleans Hornets.
 On April 15, Vince Carter moved to 27th place on the NBA's all-time scoring list during a game against the Memphis Grizzlies.

References

Dallas Mavericks seasons
Dallas Mavericks
Dallas
Dallas
2010s in Dallas